Anna M. Cramer (15 July 1873 – 4 June 1968) was a Dutch composer.

Life and career
Anna Cramer was born in Amsterdam and studied at the Conservatory of Music in Amsterdam. After graduating in 1897, she studied composition in Germany with Wilhelm Berger and Max von Schillings. After completing her studies she worked successfully as a composer and had several works performed in 1906–07. Cramer published her songs Op. 1–4 in Germany between 1907 and 1910.

Cramer lived in Munich and Berlin from 1910 to 1925, and then moved to Vienna. In Austria she collaborated with poet and composer Walter Simlinger, who wrote the libretti for her two opera, Der letzte Tanz and Dr. Pipalumbo (1926–1927).

Cramer suffered from mental health problems and in 1930 was committed to a mental institution. She was released in January 1931 and returned to The Netherlands, but then withdrew from public life. No more of her songs were published in her lifetime. However, she continued composing, and in 1958 she stored a suitcase of manuscripts at a bank in Amsterdam.

Her mental health problems grew worse, and in 1960 she was hospitalized again, remaining in a nursing home until her death at the age of 94. The suitcase containing her manuscripts was donated to Haags Gemeentemuseum, and her compositions are currently stored in the Nederlands Muziekinstituut in The Hague. She died in Blaricum.

Works
Cramer often incorporated folk themes and cabaret into her works and wrote a number of lieder.  Selected compositions include:
Sechs Lieder, op. 4 – Erwachen in den grellen Tag	
Sechs Lieder, op. 4 – Ave Rosa
Sechs Lieder, op. 4 – Michel mit der Lanze	
Sechs Lieder, op. 4 – Vale
Sechs Lieder, op. 4 – Auftrag
Sechs Lieder, op. 4 – Waldhornklänge
Wenn die Linde blüht
Fünf Gedichte, op. 1 – Bispill
Fünf Gedichte, op. 1 – Bussemann
Fünf Gedichte, op. 1 – Wa heet se doch?
Fünf Gedichte, op. 1 – De Jäger
Fünf Gedichte, op. 1 – Int Holt
Schlafliedchen für’s Peterle
Zehn Gedichte – Souvenir de Malmaison
Zehn Gedichte – In einer grossen Stadt
Zehn Gedichte – Blümekens
Zehn Gedichte – Briefwechsel
Zehn Gedichte – Spruch
Zehn Gedichte – Meiner Mutter
Zehn Gedichte – Auf einer grünen Wiese
Zehn Gedichte – Nach dem Balle
Zehn Gedichte – Siegesfest
Zehn Gedichte – Fatinga
Zwei Notturnos – Im Pavillon
Zwei Notturnos – Am Meer
Wenn der Abend sinkt
Der letzte Tanz, opera
Dr. Pipalumbo, opera

Her music has been recorded and issued on CD, including:
Anna Cramer Songs (1 Jan 2011) Aliud AL 051

References

1873 births
1968 deaths
20th-century classical composers
Dutch women classical composers
Dutch classical composers
Musicians from Amsterdam
Conservatorium van Amsterdam alumni
20th-century women composers